Groß Pankow (Prignitz) is a municipality in Prignitz district, Brandenburg, Germany. The municipality was formed in 2001 from the union of municipalities of the former Amt of Groß Pankow/Prignitz and some in Amt Pritzwalk-Land. Amt Groß Pankow/Prignitz was then dissolved.

Groß Pankow is connected via German Federal Highway B 189 to the cities of Pritzwalk, Perleberg, Wittenberge and Magdeburg.

Geography 
The municipality has 39 villages in 18 districts with the populations given in parentheses (As of March 1, 2010)

Demography

Personalities 

 Carl von Karstedt (1811-1888), conservative Reichstag deputy, born in Kleinlinde
 Erhard Hübener (1881-1958), DDP and LDPD politician, born in Tacken
 Richard Kackstein (1903-1966), national socialist politician, born in Triglitz
 Joachim Wüstenberg (1908-1993), hygienist in Gelsenkirchen, born in Klenzenhof

References

Localities in Prignitz